is a Japanese anime television series produced by Production IMS. Orange produced the 3D CG, with Gorō Taniguchi as chief director. It started airing in January 2016. The anime was split into two seasons, the first half aired in January, while the second half aired in July 2016.

Plot
Active Raid takes place in the near future with advanced technology, particularly a system known as ACTIVE (Armored Combined Tactical Intelligence Vanguard Elements). Due to the abundance of serious crime around the world, police forces begin to use ACTIVE technology along with powered armor mobile suits known as Will Wears. The series focuses on one such police unit in Japan known as Unit 8.

Characters

Unit 8 
A police unit that is authorized to use Will Wears and the ACTIVE system. Due to their collateral damage of city infrastructure, Unit 8 has a bad reputation within the police force and public media. While the Japanese title of the anime only refers to them as "Public Mobile Assault Unit Eight", official materials translate their title as "Special Public Security Fifth Division Third Mobile Assault Eighth Unit."

 
 
A new girl in Unit 8, she was assigned to monitor Unit 8 due to their bad reputation, and possibly to take steps in improving their activities. Like Sena, she is serious and prefers to stick to the law. She operates the Oscar VI Fine Familia. After the Logos incident she becomes the leader of the new Unit 9, and her reputation becomes even worse than Unit 8's. She usually utters English phrases in their conversations.
 
 
A Lieutenant and one of Unit 8's Willwearers, he operates the Oscar 2 Strike Interceptor. He has an enthusiastic personality and is laid-back when it comes to proper police procedure. Despite the difference in personality, he considers himself to be on good terms with his more serious co-workers. After the Logos incident he voluntarily befriends Mythos and even adopts him as a younger brother. The reveal that Inagi had been manipulating the Wilwear crimes to achieve his goals shatters his former reverence towards him.
 
 
A Lieutenant and one of Unit 8's Willwearers, he operates the Oscar 1 Elf Sigma. Unlike Takeru, he is serious and describes himself as "person who separate trash" while Takeru is "person who does not pick up trash." At the beginning of series, he considers leaving Unit 8 but later changes his mind, realizing that Unit 8 is where he fits in best. At the start of second half, he is seen to left the Unit and founded a new garbage collecting company. Sena still remain in the team as a civilian incorporate with the police to help them after a law established.
 
 
One of Unit 8's Operators, she has a cheerful personality and is a bit of an otaku, especially about trains. She operates the Oscar III Metistructure Ibuki.
 
 
Leader of Unit 8. Often mistaken as younger because of her appearance. She handles the aftermath of Unit 8's collateral damage and often has to apologize for their actions. She operates the Oscar V Primavera Pantera. She was once engaged to Kotaro Inagi, but broke up to pursue their respective careers.
 
 
The Section Chief of Unit 8. Despite his higher rank, he is lenient on Unit 8's activities and regularly attends social events with them. He operates the Oscar IV Kōtetsujin Nanakamado. He likes singing while off duty.
 
 
A quiet operator in Unit 8, who rarely speaks. She excels in hacking and used to be a legendary gambler called 'Bloody Mary'. After the Logos incident she leaves the police and creates her own detective agency, but remains in touch with her old coworkers.
 /
 
 The mechanic of Unit 8 in charge of the maintenance of the Willwears.

A new recruit of Unit 8 from Poland, operator of the Oscar VII Foundation Omega. For a time she feared using her Wear after an accident that left her trapped inside of it for 3 days, but she started to improve thanks to Takeru's help.

The second new recruit of Unit 8. She has scopophobia and needs a pair of special glasses that blur the eyes of others to have a conversation.

Logos 
 
 
A mysterious expert hacker watching over Tokyo, who takes an interest in Unit 8. He is the leader of the criminal movement Logos, providing Willwears to unstable or desperate people in order to provoke chaos. When he was a young boy, he was a member of a cult. His parents led the cult in a mass suicide. Due to the infamy of the incident, Mythos's sister moved abroad, but he was not allowed to follow her. Feeling trapped by a society which failed him, he founded Logos, seeking to bend Japan to his own will. After months of being in custody, when Willwear crimes become more frequent, he's "adopted" by Takeru as his younger brother Jirou Kuroki, despite his protests.
 
 
 Another hacker associated with Mythos, who seems to enjoy causing chaos. He goes rogue and starts attracting to much attention, believing he can do anything he wants with his Willwear, which makes his former associates try to kill him. He is stopped by Unit 8 but ends up in a coma after being hit by his own freezing grenade.

Unit 9 

The mechanic of Unit 9 and Asami's second in command.

Others 
 
 
An AI program akin to a mascot character, who makes various appearances throughout the series. Liko was in fact designed by Mythos to hijack computers throughout Japan for him, which eventually comes to fruition. After he surrenders to the authorities, he restores Liko to normal function.
 
 
Rin's younger sister. She attends Kouki Academy and is nearly identical in appearance to her sister. She's well versed in latin. When Hachijō is finally arrested, she punches him in the face for using her, with Rin Primavera Pantera's arm.
 
 
The student council president of Kouki Academy. He is secretly Bird, another member of Logos working with Mythos. He turns himself to the police in order to allow Mythos access the 'Ro' of the Orochi system. When Mythos is arrested, he leaves the country, but returns after finding out about Mythos release. He was hired by Inagi to enhance his popularity by providing Wilwears, but when he suggested a plan that was too much even to Inagi, he ordered his death. Easily faking his death, when Inagi was exposed, he hijacked an important satellite with the intention of making it crash and destroy Tokyo for the sake of his own amusement.
 
 
 An USDF Willwear pilot and Souichiro's ex-girlfriend. She operates the 'Senbukai' experimental unit. She worked together with Sena to take out a bomb planted in an abandoned building. She seems to be interested in returning with Souichiro, much to his consternation.
 
 
 A government official who is a friend of Rin and more lenient towards Unit 8. After his mentor dies under mysterious circumstances, he vows to become the next governor against the corruption of the government. After becoming governor he gives the Unit 8 much more freedom. His ambition of becoming Prime Minister and changing the country makes him ally with Hachijou, allowing him to commit crimes and orders his death when he outlives his usefulness. His crimes are finally exposed when a video of him blackmailing a forensics doctor into labeling the murder of his mentor as suicide is published by Mythos.
 
 
 
 
A pickpocket girl that's arrested by Takeru on the first episode. She briefly appears on every episode. It is revealed in the final episode that she's one of Hachijou's partners.

The foulmouthed chief of mechanics of Sena's new garbage collecting company.

Media

Anime
The anime is directed by Noriaki Akitaya while Goro Taniguchi served as chief director. Naruhisa Arakawa provides the script. Manga artist Shun Saeki designed the characters while Naoko Nishida adapted the style into anime. Kotaro Nakagawa composed the music. The animation is done by Production IMS, and Orange is producing the 3D CG. The anime started broadcasting in January 2016, with the second season in July 2016.

References

External links
Archived Webpage 

Anime with original screenplays
Orange (animation studio)
Production IMS
Medialink
Shōnen manga
Shueisha manga
Terrorism in fiction
Terrorism in television
Japanese computer-animated television series
Transforming heroes